Consonant harmony is a type of "long-distance" phonological assimilation, akin to the similar assimilatory process involving vowels, i.e. vowel harmony.

Examples

In Athabaskan languages
One of the more common harmony processes is coronal harmony, which affects coronal fricatives, such as s and sh. Then, all coronal fricatives belong to the +anterior class (s-like sounds) or the -anterior class (sh-like sounds). Such patterns are found in the Dene (Athabaskan) languages such as Navajo (Young and Morgan 1987, McDonough 2003), Tahltan (Shaw 1991), Western Apache, and in Chumash on the California coast (Applegate 1972, Campbell 1997). In Tahltan, Shaw showed that coronal harmony affects three coronal fricatives, s, sh and the interdental th. The following examples are given by de Reuse: in Western Apache, the verbal prefix si- is an alveolar fricative, as in the following forms:

  "a container and its contents are in position"
  "mushy matter is in position"
  "a load/pack/burden is in position"
  "three or more flexible objects are in position"
  "a slender flexible object is in position"
  "a solid roundish object is in position"
  "a flat flexible object is in position"
  "liquid matter is in position"

However, when the prefix  occurs before a verb stem that contains a post-alveolar affricate, the  surfaces as the post-alveolar :

  "three or more solid rigid inanimate objects are in position"

Thus, all sibilant obstruents (fricatives and affricates) in these languages are divided into two groups, +anterior and -anterior. In Navajo, as in most languages with consonant harmony, there is a constraint on the shape of roots (a well-formedness constraint) that is identical to the harmony process. All roots with sibilant affricates or fricatives have the same value for anteriority. Shaw (1991) provides a phonological analysis of this process, using data from research on Tahltan.

There are two interesting aspects of the process in Navajo. Firstly, morphemes that participate are domain-specific, only the last two domains are affected (conjunct + stem). Verbal morphemes from the outer or 'disjunct' domain are not affected by the process: the process is morphologically conditioned. Secondly, the lateral affricate and fricative (and ) appear with both values. Young and Morgan (1987) offer an extensive sets of examples of this type of morpheme alternation in Navajo.

In Sanskrit
The retroflexion spreads from left to right affecting any coronal nasal until the word boundary is reached. On the other hand, in the word अर्चन arcana "homage, praising" (from *ṛc "to praise" + -man- + -a) consonant harmony is prevented by the coronal stop  (IAST: c) which blocks the assimilation.

In Old Chinese
Old Chinese probably had some constraint governing the shape of disyllables. According to modern reconstructions of Old Chinese phonology, type A and B syllables almost never co-occur in a disyllabic word. In the latest reconstruction of Old Chinese phonology proposed by Baxter and Sagart (2014), this type A vs. type B distinction can be traced back to the presence or the absence of pharyngealization respectively, cf.   < OC  "to bring into" (type A) and   < OC  "to enter" (type B) only differing by the [±pharyngeal] trait of the initial consonant. Onsets of type B syllables, lacking of pharyngealization, are subject to palatalization in Middle Chinese (indicated by a palatal medial -j- in Baxter's notation), while type A pharyngealized onsets failed to palatalize. In many ancient disyllabic words type A and type B characters do not mix, there are almost solely bisyllabic morphemes either with type A syllables, such as:

   < MC  < OC  "butterfly"
   < MC  < OC  "carefree"
   < MC  < OC  "beautiful and gentle (said of a woman)"
or with type B syllables, including:
   < MC  < OC  "Qilin" (a mythical beast)
   < MC  < OC  "cricket"
   < MC  < OC  "uneven, irregular"

Such pattern seems to suggest the existence of some sort of pharyngeal harmony in Old Chinese. However, there are notable, though infrequent, exceptions to this tendency, manifesting in ancient compounds that are generally hard to analyze. From this list the following word is often mentioned:
   < MC bjuwngH hwang < OC  "Chinese phoenix, fabulous bird"

In Maghrebi Arabic
Consonant harmony can also be observed in Moroccan Arabic and some southern dialects of Algerian Arabic in sequences of sibilants:

In other languages

Guaraní shows nasal harmony, and certain affixes have alternative forms according to whether the root includes a nasal (vowel or consonant) or not. For example, the reflexive prefix is realized as oral  before an oral stem like  "kill", but as nasal  before a nasal stem like  "hit". The ã makes the stem nasal.

Some Finnish-speakers find it hard to pronounce both 'b' and 'p' in loanwords (pub) and so they voice or devoice the entire word. It should, however, be noted that the distinction between the consonants is not native to Finnish. Native Finnish words do not use .

In the Ngeté-Herdé language of Cameroon, voicing of word-medial obstruents is strongly influenced by voicing of the word-initial consonant. Generally, all obstruents in a word are either voiced or voiceless.

See also
Vowel harmony
Dissimilation
Fusion (phonetics)
 Consonant gradation

Notes

Bibliography
 Applegate, Richard. (1972). Ineseño Chumash Grammar. (Doctoral dissertation, University of California, Berkeley).
 
 Campbell, Lyle. (1997). American Indian languages: The historical linguistics of Native America. New York: Oxford University Press. .
 
 de Reuse, Willem J. (2006). A practical grammar of the San Carlos Apache language. LINCOM Studies in Native American Linguistics 51. LINCOM.
 Rose, S. and R. Walker (2004). "A Typology of Consonant Agreement as Correspondence." Language 80:3: 475–531.
 McDonough, J. M. (2003). The Navajo Sound System. Dordrecht, Kluwer.
Shaw, P. (1991). Consonant harmony systems: the special status of coronal harmony. The special status of Coronal Harmony  Ed. Prunet, Academic Press.
Young, R. and W. Morgan (1987). The Navajo Language. Albuquerque, University  of New Mexico Press.

Assimilation (linguistics)